Uchastok №12 is a rural locality (a settlement) in Shaninskoye Rural Settlement, Talovsky District, Voronezh Oblast, Russia. The population was 216 as of 2010. There are 2 streets. No cap.

Geography 
Uchastok №12 is located 14 km northeast of Talovaya (the district's administrative centre) by road.

References 

Rural localities in Talovsky District